Calan Mai ( "Calan (first day) of May") or Calan Haf ( "first day of Summer") is a May Day celebration in Wales held on 1 May. Events start on the evening before, known as May Eve, with bonfires; as with Calan Gaeaf or 1 November, the night before is considered an Ysbrydnos or "spirit night" when spirits are out and about and divination is possible. The tradition of lighting bonfires celebrating this occasion happened annually in South Wales until the middle of the 19th century.

Calan Haf parallels Beltane and other May Day traditions in Europe.

Customs
On Nos Galan Mai or May Eve, villagers gather hawthorn ("white-thorn") branches and flowers which they would then use to decorate the outside of their houses, celebrating new growth and fertility.
In Anglesey and Caernarfonshire it would be common on May Eve to have  "playing straw man" or  "hanging a straw man". A man who had lost his sweetheart to another man would make a man out of straw and put it somewhere in the vicinity of where the girl lived. The straw man represented her new sweetheart and had a note pinned to it. Often the situation led to a fight between the two men at the May Fair.
Being the time between Summer and Winter, Calan Haf would be the time to stage a mock fight between the two seasons. The man representing Winter carried a stick of blackthorn ( "black-thorn") and a shield that had pieces of wool stuck on it to represent snow. The man representing Summer was decorated with garlands of flowers and ribbons and carried a willow-wand which had spring flowers tied on it with ribbons. A mock battle took place in which the forces of Winter threw straw and dry underbrush at the forces of Summer who retaliated with birch branches, willow rods, and young ferns. Eventually the forces of Summer would win and a May King and Queen were chosen and crowned, after which there was feasting, dancing, games and drinking until the next morning.
May Day was the time that the twmpath chwarae or "tump for playing" (a kind of village green) was officially opened. Through the summer months in some villages the people would gather on the twmpath chwarae in the evenings to dance and play various sports. The green was usually situated on the top of a hill and a mound was made where the fiddler or harpist sat. Sometimes branches of oak decorated the mound and the people would dance in a circle around it.
Dawnsio haf "summer dancing" was a feature of the May Day celebration, as was carolau Mai "May carols" also known as carolau haf "summer carols" or canu dan y pared "singing under the wall", these songs being often of a bawdy or sexual nature. The singers would visit families on May morning accompanied by a harpist or fiddler, to wish them the greetings of the season and give thanks to "the bountiful giver of all good gifts." If their singing was thought worthy, they would be rewarded with food, drink, and possibly money.
Common drinks during Calan Mai festivities were metheglin or mead. Sometimes it was made of herbs, including woodruff, a sweet-smelling herb which was often put in wine in times past to make a man merry and act as a tonic for the heart and liver. Elderberry and rhubarb wines were popular and the men also liked various beers.

References
Trefor M. Owen. Welsh Folk Customs. Gomer Press, Llandysul 1987
Marie Trevelyan. Folklore and Folk Stories of Wales. EP Publishing Ltd, Wakefield 1973

Welsh culture
May observances
May Day